The Christian Democratic Peasants' Party of Moldova (PȚCD) was a political party in Moldova.

History
Prior to the 1998 elections the party joined the Democratic Convention of Moldova alliance (CDM). The CDM finished second, winning 26 of the 101 seats. Together with the other non-Communist parties, it established the Alliance for Democracy and Reforms, which was able to form a government.

The party ran alone in the 2001 elections. However, it received just 0.3% of the vote and failed to win a seat.

References

Defunct political parties in Moldova